Mahdi Pourrahnama (born 20 June 1995) is an Iranian para taekwondo practitioner. He won the silver medal in the men's 75 kg event at the 2020 Summer Paralympics in Tokyo, Japan.

References

Living people
1995 births
Iranian male taekwondo practitioners
Taekwondo practitioners at the 2020 Summer Paralympics
Medalists at the 2020 Summer Paralympics
Paralympic silver medalists for Iran
Paralympic medalists in taekwondo
People from Bandar-e Anzali
Sportspeople from Gilan province
20th-century Iranian people
21st-century Iranian people